Duminichsky District is an administrative and municipal district (raion), one of the twenty-four in Kaluga Oblast, Russia. It is located in the south central part of the oblast. Its administrative center is the urban locality (a settlement) of Duminichi. Population:  The population of Duminichi accounts for 40.6% of the district's total population.

References

Notes

Sources

Districts of Kaluga Oblast